The Beecher-McFadden Estate is a historic estate located on East Main Street in Peekskill, Westchester County, New York.

Description and history 
The estate includes an imposing brick mansion and a large support building set among scenic landscaping. The mansion was originally built in about 1875 in a Victorian Gothic style, and was extensively remodeled in the 1920s in the Tudor Revival style. It is a large, -story, asymmetrical brick building with stone trim, Tudor arches, and plain balustrades. The north elevation retains the original -story, red brick walls with polychrome brick trim. The large support structure has a two-story center section, flanked by -story wings, and is in the Jacobean Revival style. The property was originally developed by Rev. Henry Ward Beecher (1813-1887), then purchased by the locally prominent McFadden family in 1902.

It was added to the National Register of Historic Places on November 2, 1987.

References

Houses on the National Register of Historic Places in New York (state)
Tudor Revival architecture in New York (state)
Houses completed in 1875
Houses in Westchester County, New York
Buildings and structures in Peekskill, New York
National Register of Historic Places in Westchester County, New York
African-American history of Westchester County, New York